The canton of Baïse-Armagnac is an administrative division of the Gers department, southwestern France. It was created at the French canton reorganisation which came into effect in March 2015. Its seat is in Condom.

It consists of the following communes:
 
Ayguetinte
Beaucaire
Béraut
Blaziert
Castelnau-sur-l'Auvignon
Castéra-Verduzan
Caussens
Condom
Lagardère
Larroque-Saint-Sernin
Maignaut-Tauzia
Roquepine
Saint-Orens-Pouy-Petit
Saint-Puy
Valence-sur-Baïse

References

Cantons of Gers